Daniel Sion Kubert (October 18, 1947 – January 5, 2010) was  an American mathematician who introduced modular units and Kubert identities.

He received his PhD in mathematics from Harvard University in 1973.

Selected publications

References

External links

1947 births
2010 deaths
20th-century American mathematicians
21st-century American mathematicians
Harvard University alumni